Lindomar Barbosa Alves (born 18 October 1969) better known as Lindomar Garçon is a Brazilian politician and pastor. Although born in Mato Grosso, he has spent his political career representing Rondônia, having served as state representative from 2007 to 2019.

Personal life
Lindomar was born to Adão José Alves and Alcemira de Souza Barbosa Alves. In his early political career shortly before being elected mayor he adopted "Garçon" (meaning waiter) to his name as he has worked as a waiter in his youth. He is a pastor and elder in the Assembleias de Deus church.

Political career
Lindomar voted in favor of the impeachment of then-president Dilma Rousseff. He voted in favor of the 2017 Brazilian labor reform, and would vote against a corruption investigation into Rousseff's successor Michel Temer.

In 2012 Lindomar ran for mayor in the city of Porto Velho, but was defeated in the second round of voting by Mauro Nazif Rasul.

In 2018 Lindomar switched allegiance to the Brazilian Republican Party, citing that the party's platform was more in line with his Christian values.

References

1969 births
Living people
People from Rondonópolis
Republicans (Brazil) politicians
Brazilian Democratic Movement politicians
Green Party (Brazil) politicians
Brazilian Social Democracy Party politicians
Members of the Chamber of Deputies (Brazil) from Rondônia
Brazilian Assemblies of God pastors